Dypsis ligulata is a species of flowering plant in the family Arecaceae. It is found only in Madagascar. It is threatened by habitat loss.

Description
Dypsis ligulata is a single-stemmed evergreen palm growing 4 – 8 metres tall. The unbranched stem can be 15 cm or more in diameter, topped by a crown of leaves. The plant is harvested from the wild for local use as a food and medicine.

Range and habitat
Dypsis ligulata is endemic to the Sambirano region of northwestern Madagascar. It is known only from a single location at the base of Mont Kalabenono, in the Ambilobe area. It grows in humid forest on sandstone substrate at 100 meters elevation.

Conservation and threats
There is insufficient data to assess the status of this species. It has not been seen in the wild since 1923 and the humid forest at Ambilobe has not been well surveyed. The plant is classified as 'Data Deficient' in the IUCN Red List of Threatened Species (2011).

References

ligulata
Endemic flora of Madagascar
Flora of the Madagascar subhumid forests
Data deficient plants
Taxonomy articles created by Polbot
Taxa named by Henri Lucien Jumelle